Kirk Dwight Cummins (born 8 November 1972) is a former Barbadian sprinter who competed in the men's 100m competition at the 1996 Summer Olympics. He recorded a 10.33 in his first heat, enough to qualify for the next round past the heats. He ran a 10.45 in the quarterfinals, ending his stay in the competition. His personal best is 10.25, set in 1996.

References

1972 births
Barbadian male sprinters
Athletes (track and field) at the 1996 Summer Olympics
Olympic athletes of Barbados
World Athletics Championships athletes for Barbados
Living people